The Bridge Creek Shelter is a rustic log and shingle shelter in North Cascades National Park. It was built in the 1930s by the U.S. Forest Service with Civilian Conservation Corps labor.

References

Park buildings and structures on the National Register of Historic Places in Washington (state)
Government buildings completed in 1938
Rustic architecture in Washington (state)
Buildings and structures in Chelan County, Washington
Civilian Conservation Corps in Washington (state)
National Register of Historic Places in North Cascades National Park
National Register of Historic Places in Chelan County, Washington